The 2015 PDC Pro Tour was a series of non-televised darts tournaments organised by the Professional Darts Corporation (PDC). Professional Dart Players Association Players Championships, UK Open Qualifiers, and European Tour events were the events that made up the Pro Tour. This year there were 35 PDC Pro Tour events held – 20 Players Championships, six UK Open Qualifiers, and nine European Tour events.

Prize money
Prize money for each Players Championship increased from £50,000 to £60,000 per event and the European Tour increased from £100,000 to £115,000 per event. UK Open Qualifiers stayed the same as last year.

PDC Pro Tour Card
128 players were granted Tour Cards, which enabled them to participate in all Players Championships, UK Open Qualifiers and European Tour events.

Tour Cards 
The 2015 Tour Cards were awarded to:
(64) The top 64 players from the PDC Order of Merit after the 2015 World Championship.
(26) The 26 qualifiers from 2014 Q-School not ranked in the top 64 of the PDC Order of Merit following the World Championship.
(2) Two highest qualifiers from 2014 Challenge Tour ( and ).
(2) Two highest qualifiers from 2014 Youth Tour ( and ).
(34) The 34 qualifiers from 2015 Q-School.

The offer of four places for the semi-finalists of the 2015 BDO World Darts Championship were withdrawn from this year.

Q-School
The PDC Pro Tour Q-School took place at the Robin Park Tennis Centre in Wigan from January 14–17. The following players won two-year tour cards on each of the days played:

A Q-School Order of Merit was also created by using the following points system:

To complete the field of 128 Tour Card Holders, places were allocated down the final Q-School Order of Merit. The following players picked up Tour Cards as a result:

UK Open Qualifiers
Six qualifiers took place to determine seedings for the 2015 UK Open.

Players Championships
There were 20 Players Championship events in 2015.

PDC European Tour

PDC Challenge Tour
The PDC Unicorn Challenge Tour was open to all PDPA Associate Members who failed to win a Tour Card at Qualifying School. The players who finished first and second received two-year Tour Cards to move onto the PDC Pro Tour in 2016 and 2017. In addition, the players who finished from third to eighth will receive free entry to the 2016 PDC Q-School.

PDC Development Tour
The PDC Unicorn Development Tour (formerly the PDC Youth Tour) was open to players aged 16–23. The players who finished first and second on the Order of Merit received two-year Tour Cards to move onto the PDC Pro Tour in 2016 and 2017. In addition, the players who finished from third to eighth will receive free entry to the 2016 PDC Q-School. Prize money was doubled from the 2014 season, with £200,000 on offer for the 17 youth events, including £40,000 for the 2015 PDC World Youth Championship.

Scandinavian Darts Corporation Pro Tour
The Scandinavian Pro Tour had eight events in 2015, with a total of €40,000 on offer. The top player, Kim Viljanen, and the runner-up, Per Laursen, on the 2015 SDC Order of Merit qualified to play in the 2016 World Championship preliminary round.

EuroAsian Darts Corporation (EADC) Pro Tour
The 6 EADC Pro Tour events and the 2016 World Championship Qualifier will be played at Omega Plaza Business Center, Moscow. Players from Armenia, Azerbaijan, Belarus, Georgia, Kazakhstan, Kyrgyzstan, Moldova, Russia, Tajikistan, Turkmenistan, Uzbekistan and Ukraine are eligible to play.

Australian Grand Prix Pro Tour
The Australian Grand Prix rankings are calculated from 25 events across Australia. The top player in the rankings, automatically qualified for the 2016 World Championship.

World Championship PDPA Qualifier

World Darts Championship International Qualifiers

References

External links
2015 PDC calendar
Events at dartsdatabase.co.uk

 
Pro Tour
PDC Pro Tour